John Tedeku (born 4 January 2002) is a Ghanaian footballer who currently plays as a defender for Ghana Premier League side WAFA.

Career 
Born in Dansoman, a suburb of Accra, Tedeku started his career with West African Football Academy, he was promoted to the senior team in October 2019 after distinguishing himself with the academy's U16 side. He made his debut on 29 December 2020, playing the full 90 minutes in a 1–0 loss to Karela United. During his debut season, 2019–20 season he made seven league appearances as the league was cancelled due to the restrictions imposed to control the COVID-19 pandemic in Ghana. With the league set to restart, he was named on the club's squad list for the 2020–21 season.

References

External links 

 
 

Living people
2002 births
Association football defenders
Ghanaian footballers
West African Football Academy players
Ghana Premier League players